Miguel Ángel Aceval Muñoz (born 8 January 1983) is a Chilean former footballer who played as a centre back.

Career

Professional
Aceval began in the youth system of Colo-Colo and made his professional debut on August 18, 2001 with Colo-Colo against Huachipato. While with Colo Colo, Aceval starts receiving acclaim for his long range shooting. After the 2006 Clausura championship with Colo-Colo, he made a loan move to O'Higgins before returning to Colo-Colo. While with Colo Colo, Aceval was a key player in helping the club to Chilean Primera División titles during the 2002 Clausura, 2006 Apertura, 2006 Clausura, and 2007 Clausura.

In 2008, Aceval went to play for a short spell with Uruguayan club Defensor Sporting, then he made his return to the Chilean league with Huachipato. After his brief spell with Huachipato, he signed with Unión Española. While with Unión Española, Aceval appeared in 48 league matches and scored 9 goals. For the 2011 season he joined Universidad de Concepción and scored 5 goals in 30 appearances.

Aceval left Chile at the end of the 2011 season signing with Toronto FC on January 30, 2012. He scored his first goal on a free kick for Toronto FC against Santos Laguna in the 2011–12 CONCACAF Champions League semifinals on March 28, 2012.

On June 18, 2012, Miguel Aceval, along with two other Toronto FC players, were arrested in Houston and charged with public intoxication. On July 26, the club had announced that they had terminated Aceval's contract.

International
Aceval received his first call up and played for the Chile national team on September 4, 2011 in a friendly against Mexico.

Honours

Club
 Colo-Colo
Primera División de Chile (4): 2002 Clausura, 2006 Apertura, 2006 Clausura, 2007 Clausura

Toronto FC
 Canadian Championship (1): 2012

Huachipato
 Primera División de Chile (1): 2012 Clausura

References

External links

1983 births
Living people
Footballers from Santiago
Chilean footballers
Chilean expatriate footballers
Chile international footballers
Colo-Colo footballers
O'Higgins F.C. footballers
C.D. Huachipato footballers
Unión Española footballers
Universidad de Concepción footballers
Toronto FC players
Curicó Unido footballers
Deportes Temuco footballers
San Antonio Unido footballers
Chilean Primera División players
Primera B de Chile players
Major League Soccer players
Segunda División Profesional de Chile players
Expatriate soccer players in Canada
Expatriate soccer players in the United States 
Chilean expatriate sportspeople in Canada
Chilean expatriate sportspeople in the United States 
Association football defenders